Piton is a Pilsner beer brand from the island of Saint Lucia, brewed by Windward & Leeward Brewing Limited, which is owned by Heineken. The beer was named for the Gros Piton and Petit Piton mountains on the island. It was first brewed on October 7, 1992.

References

External links 
Windward and Leeward Brewing website

Beer in the Caribbean
Companies of Saint Lucia
Heineken brands